Brookland Stadium, or Killion Field, was the athletic field for Catholic University in Brookland, Washington, D.C. from 1924 to 1985. It was located on the main campus of The Catholic University of America, next to Brookland Gymnasium (today's Edward M. Crough Center for Architectural Studies), in the area now occupied by the Columbus School of Law and the Law School Lawn.

Primarily used for college football, it was also a baseball and soccer stadium. It hosted the second leg of the 1970 NASL Final between the Rochester Lancers and the Washington Darts.

History
In the early 1920s, Rector Thomas Joseph Shahan was the biggest booster for the new stadium, saying he expected "the finished Bowl would be our chief financial asset". On May 26, 1923, ground was broken. Engineering professor Louis Crook served as the stadium's planner.

On September 30, 1924, Boston College's student newspaper The Heights wrote:

The stadium was dedicated on October 4, 1924, with a game against the Quantico Marines Devil Dogs, with President Calvin Coolidge in attendance, to become the new home of the Catholic University Cardinals football team.

On October 29, 1983, Brookland Stadium hosted the last important football game with a victory of the Cardinals over the Georgetown Hoyas in the nation's capital own Holy War for the Steven Dean Memorial Trophy.

In 1983, ground was broken by Marion Barry, Mayor of the District of Columbia, and William J. Byron, President of Catholic University of America, for a new athletic facility, the Raymond A. DuFour Athletic Center, opened in 1985. It includes Cardinal Stadium, Brookland Stadium's replacement.

References

External links
 Old picture of the stadium

American football venues in Washington, D.C.
Baseball venues in Washington, D.C.
Brookland (Washington, D.C.)
Catholic University Cardinals football
Defunct college football venues
Defunct soccer venues in the United States
Defunct sports venues in Washington, D.C.
Demolished buildings and structures in Washington, D.C.
Demolished sports venues in the United States
North American Soccer League (1968–1984) stadiums
Soccer venues in Washington, D.C.
Sports venues completed in 1924
1924 establishments in Washington, D.C.
1985 disestablishments in Washington, D.C.